The Minister of Justice is a Finnish Government ministerial position. The Minister of Justice is in charge of the Ministry of Justice.

Finland's incumbent Minister of Justice for the Marin Cabinet is Anna-Maja Henriksson of the Swedish People's Party.

List of Ministers of Justice

Source:

References

'
Justice